Poliopogon is a genus of sponges belonging to the family Pheronematidae.

The species of this genus are found in Pacific Ocean.

Species:

Poliopogon amadou 
Poliopogon canaliculatus 
Poliopogon claviculus 
Poliopogon distortus 
Poliopogon maitai 
Poliopogon mendocino 
Poliopogon micropentactinus 
Poliopogon microuncinata 
Poliopogon zonecus

References

Sponges